Bruch is a German surname, sometimes used with the locational particle "vom", meaning "of the". Notable people with the surname include:

Gerd vom Bruch (born 1941), German footballer and manager
Klaus vom Bruch (born 1952), German media artist
Walter Bruch (1908-1990), German inventor of PAL analog television standard

German-language surnames